Uda Devi Pasi  was an Indian women freedom fighter who participated in the war on behalf of Indian soldiers against the British East India Company, during the Indian Rebellion of 1857. She was a member of the women's squad of Wajid Ali Shah, the sixth Nawab of Awadh.

While upper caste histories highlight the resistance contributions of upper caste heroines like Jhansi Ki Rani, the reality was also that the battles for independence from British colonial rule also featured Dalit resistance fighters like Uda Devi Pasi. Uda Devi Pasi and other female Dalit participants are today remembered as the warriors or “Dalit Veeranganas” of the 1857 Indian Rebellion. She was married to Makka Pasi who was a soldier in the army of Hazrat Mahal. 

On seeing the rising anger of the Indian people with the British administration, Uda Devi reached out to the queen of that district, Begum Hazrat Mahal to enlist for the war. In order to prepare for the battle that was headed their way, the Begum helped her form a women’s battalion under her command. When the British attacked Awadh, both Uda Devi and her husband were part of the armed resistance. When she heard that her husband had died in the battle, she unleashed her final campaign in full force.

Battle of Sikandar Bagh 
Uda Devi took part in the Battle in Sikandar Bagh in November 1857. After issuing instructions to her battalion, she climbed up a pipal tree and began shooting at advancing British soldiers. A British officer noted that many of the casualties had bullet wounds indicating steep, downward trajectory. Suspecting a hidden sniper, he ordered his officers to fire at the trees and dislodged a rebel who fell to the ground dead. Upon investigation, the sniper was revealed as Uda Devi Pasi. William Forbes-Mitchell, in Reminiscences of the Great Mutiny, writes of Uda Devi: "She was armed with a pair of heavy old-pattern cavalry pistols, one of which was in her belt still loaded, and her pouch was still about half full of ammunition, while from her perch in the tree, which had been carefully prepared before the attack, she had killed more than half-a-dozen men."

The Pasis of Pilibhit, in particular, come together on November 16 every year to commemorate the anniversary of Uda Devi Pasi's martyrdom.

See also
Pasi (caste)
Bijli Pasi
Madari Pasi

References 

Indian women in war
Revolutionaries of the Indian Rebellion of 1857
Indian independence activists from Uttar Pradesh
History of Awadh
Dalit history
1857 deaths
Women from Uttar Pradesh
Military personnel from Uttar Pradesh
People from Lucknow district
Women Indian independence activists